Dolores Mercedes Koch (née Gonzalez, 1928 - 11 June 2009) was a Cuban American literary critic and translator who was a pioneer in the area of microfiction.

Biography 
Koch was born in Havana, Cuba in 1928.

Dolores Koch received her PhD in Latin American Literature from the City University of New York, and in addition to her work on microfiction, translated to English several important Spanish-language works, including those of Laura Restrepo, Jorge Bucay, Alina Fernández, Emily Schindler, Enrique Joven, and her compatriot Reinaldo Arenas, whose work Before Night Falls was adapted to a film of the same name.

Her article (in Spanish) "El micro-relato en México: Torri, Arreola, Monterroso y Avilés Fabila", published in 1981, is the first critical work on microfiction in the Spanish-speaking world.

Koch died at her home in New York on 11 June 2009.

References

Further reading
 https://rbsc.princeton.edu/collections/dolores-koch-collection-reinaldo-arenas

External links 

 Dolores Koch collection of Reinaldo Arenas at Princeton University Library Special Collections

1928 births
2009 deaths
Writers from Havana
Cuban emigrants to the United States
Spanish–English translators
American literary critics
Women literary critics
City University of New York alumni
20th-century American women writers
American writers of Cuban descent
20th-century Cuban women writers
20th-century translators
20th-century American writers
20th-century Cuban writers
21st-century American women
American women critics